Neoxantha amicta is a species of beetle in the family Cerambycidae, and the only species in the genus Neoxantha. It was described by Pascoe in 1856.

References

Saperdini
Beetles described in 1856